The Rev. Edmund Dowse House is a historic house in Sherborn, Massachusetts. The Greek Revival house was built in 1838 for the Rev. Edmund Dowse, the first pastor of the Evangelical Society (now the Pilgrim Church), whose sone, William Bradford Homer Dowse, was a major benefactor of the town. The house was listed on the National Register of Historic Places in 1986.

Description and history
The Dowse House is set on the north side of Farm Road, an east–west through road leading east from Sherborn center. Facing east, it is a -story wood-frame structure, three bays wide, with a side-facing gable roof and claobpard siding. The main entrance is in the rightmost bay, sheltered by a flat-roof portico with square Doric columns and Italianate brackets. A -story ell extends to the north side, and a two-story polygonal bay window projects on the south side.

The house was built in 1838, during a significant period of growth in the town. It was built for Rev. Edmund Dowse, who was the first pastor of the Evangelical Society (now Pilgrim Church), and served in that position for 67 years. He was also politically active, serving in the state legislature and on town civic bodies. His son, William Bradford Homer Dowse, was a successful lawyer and businessman, educated at Harvard and practicing patent law.  He was a major benefactor to the town, funding construction of Dowse Memorial Library (now town hall, built 1914), and the Memory Statue, built 1924.

See also
National Register of Historic Places listings in Sherborn, Massachusetts

References

Houses on the National Register of Historic Places in Middlesex County, Massachusetts
Houses in Sherborn, Massachusetts
Houses completed in 1838
Greek Revival architecture in Massachusetts